The Hazaras are an ethnic group and a principal component of the population of Afghanistan, native to, and primarily residing in the Hazaristan region in central Afghanistan and the northern regions of the Baluchistan province in Pakistan. They are one of the largest ethnic groups in Afghanistan, and a significant minority group in Pakistan, mostly in Quetta, and as well as in Iran. They speak the Dari and Hazaragi dialects of Persian. Dari, one of the two official languages in Afghanistan.

Hazaras are considered to be one of the most persecuted groups in Afghanistan, and their persecution has occurred various times across previous decades.

Etymology 
The etymology of the word "Hazara" remains disputed, but some have differing opinions on the term.

Babur, founder of the Mughal Empire in the early 16th century, records the name "Hazara" in Baburnama, and he has mentioned "Hazara" as "Turkoman Hazaras" several times. 

Historian Abdul Hai Habibi considers the word "Hazara" to be very old, and it is derived from "Hazala", which has changed to "Hazara" over time and has meant "good-hearted".

It is said that the name "Hazara" derives from the Persian word "Hazar" meaning "thousand". It may be the translation of the Mongolic word, a military unit of 1,000 soldiers at the time of Genghis Khan.

Origin

Despite being one of the principal population elements of Afghanistan, the origins of the Hazara people have not been fully reconstructed but various theories have been formed about the racial origin of the Hazara people, the most important of which are as follows:
 Hazaras as indigenous inhabitants of Afghanistan
 Hazaras as a mixed race
 Hazaras as Turkic
 Hazaras as Mongol
 Hazaras as Turco-Mongol

As indigenous inhabitants

According to this theory, the Hazaras have not migrated from another land, but have lived in their current location since long ago.

As a mixed race
Due to genetic and linguistic analysis, Hazaras are certainly a racially mixed group with Hazaras having varying degrees of Iranian, Mongolic and Turkic ancestry. Additionally, Hazaras share common physical attributes, physical appearance, and parts of their culture and language with Central Asian Turkic tribes and the Mongols. Nonetheless, as a mixed ethnic group, phenotypes can vary, with some noting that certain Hazaras may resemble Europeans or peoples native to the Iranian plateau.

Over the course of centuries, invading Mongols and Turco-Mongols mixed with the local indigenous Turkic and Iranic populations. Notably, the Qara'unas, the Central Asian Chagatai Turco-Mongols, the Ilkhanate and the Timurids, all of whom settled in Hazarajat and mixed with the local populations. While academics agree that Hazaras are ultimately the result of a combination of several Turkic, Mongol and Iranic tribes, there is a dispute by some on what groups played the largest roles in this combination.

As Mongol
A number of researchers in their works write focusing on the Mongolic component. Authors, along with the term Hazaras, use the name Hazara Mongols: such as Elizabeth Emaline Bacon, Barbara A. West, Yuri Averyanov, Elbrus Sattsayev and other. According to historian Lutfi Temirkhanov, the Mongolian detachments left in Afghanistan by Genghis Khan or his successors became the starting layer, the basis of the Hazara ethnogenesis. According to him, the Turkic elements compared to the Mongolian ones played a secondary role. The Hazaras in the Ghilji neighborhood are called Mongols. The participation of the Mongols in the ethnogenesis of the Hazaras is evidenced by linguistic data, historical sources, data on toponymy, as well as works on population genetics. Such scholars as Vasily Bartold, Ármin Vámbéry, Vadim Masson, Vadim Romodin, Ilya Petrushevsky, Allah Rakha, Fatima, Min-Sheng Peng, Atif Adan, Rui Bi, Memona Yasmin, Yong-Gang Yao wrote about the use of the Mongolian language by the Hazaras.

As Turco-Mongol

Some claim that the Hazaras have Turco-Mongol roots. That is, they believe that the Hazaras are the survivors of Turkic and Mongol soldiers who came to Afghanistan with Genghis Khan and Timur in separate periods and settled there and created a nation called the Hazaras over several centuries.

Genetics 

Genetically, the Hazara are a mixture of West Eurasian and East Eurasian components, i.e. racially Eurasian. Genetic research suggests that the Hazaras of Afghanistan cluster closely with the Uzbeks population of the country, while both groups are at a notable distance from Afghanistan's Tajiks and Pashtuns populations. There is evidence of both paternal and maternal relations to Turkic peoples and Mongols amongst Hazaras.

Begoña Martínez-Cruz in 2011, together with other scientists, as a result of a study of autosomal microsatellite loci, concluded that the Hazaras are closely related to the Turkic populations of Central Asia rather than Mongols and East Asians or Indo-Iranians.

In a 2019-2020 study (by Guanglin He, Atif Adnan, Allah Rakha, Ivy Hui-Yuan Yeh and other), outgroup and admixture f3, f4, f4-ratio, qpWave, and qpAdm results further demonstrate that some Hazaras shares more alleles with East Asians than with other Central Asians and carries 57.8% Mongolian-related ancestry. According to Guanglin He, Hazaras have experienced genetic admixture with the local or neighboring populations and formed the current East-West Eurasian admixed genetic profile after their separation from the Mongolians. According to Atif Adnan, admixture and outgroup findings further clarified that Hazara have 57.8% gene pool from Mongolians.

East Eurasian male and female ancestry are supported by studies in genetic genealogy as well. East Asian maternal haplogroups (mtDNA) make up about 35%, suggesting that the male descendants Mongolic and Turkic peoples were accompanied by women of East Asian ancestry, though the Hazaras as a whole have mostly west Eurasian mtDNA. Women of Non-East Asian mtDNA in Hazaras are at about 65%, most which are West Eurasians and some South Asian.

The most frequent paternal haplogroups found amongst the Pakistani Hazara in one study were haplogroup C-M217 at 40% (10/25) and Haplogroup R1b at 32% (8/25). Relatively high frequencies of R1b were also found in Eastern Russian Tatars and Bashkirs. All three groups are thought to be associated with the Golden Horde. Haplogroup C-M217, also known as C2, is most frequent haplogroup in Mongol and Kazakh populations. According to PhD Sabitov: "Y-DNA haplogroup C2 is certainly associated with the expansion of the Mongols". According to PhD Zhabagin: "The high frequency of haplogroup C2-M217 is consistent with the Mongolian origin of the Hazaras". Haplogroup C-M217 originated in Mongolia about ~ 1,000 years ago.

One study about paternal DNA haplogroups of Afghanistan shows that the Y-DNA haplogroups R1a and C-M217 are the most common, followed by J2-M172 and L-M20. Some Hazaras also have the haplogroup R1a1a-M17, E1b1b1-M35, L-M20 and H-M69, which are common in Tajiks, Pashtuns as well as Indian populations. In one study, a small minority had the haplogroup B-M60, normally found in East Africa, and in one mtDNA study of Hazara, mtDNA Haplogroup L (which is of African origin) was detected at a frequency of 7.5%.

A recent study shows that some Hazaras are linked to the Uyghurs.

History 
The first mention of Hazaras is made by Babur in the early 16th century and later by the court historians of Shah Abbas of the Safavid dynasty. It is reported that they embraced Shia Islam between the end of the 16th and the beginning of the 17th century, during the Safavid periods. Hazara men, along with those of other ethnic groups, were recruited to the army of Ahmad Shah Durrani in the 18th century.

19th century 

During the second reign of Dost Mohammad Khan in the 19th century, Hazaras from Hazarajat began to be taxed for the first time. However, for the most part, they still managed to keep their regional autonomy until the 1892 Battle of Uruzgan and the subsequent subjugation of Abdur Rahman Khan began in the late 19th century.

When the Treaty of Gandomak was signed and the Second Anglo-Afghan War ended in 1880, Abdur Rahman Khan set out a goal to bring Hazaristan, Turkistan and Kafiristan under his control. He launched several campaigns in Hazarajat due to resistance from the Hazaras in which his forces committed atrocities. The southern part of Hazarajat was spared as they accepted his rule, while the other parts of Hazarajat rejected Abdur Rahman and instead supported his uncle, Sher Ali Khan. In response to this Abdur Rahman waged a war against tribal leaders who rejected his policies and rule. This is known as the Hazara Uprisings.

These campaigns had a catastrophic impact on the demographics of Hazaras causing over sixty percent of them to perish with some becoming displaced.

After these massacres, Abdul Rahman Khan forced many Hazara families from the Hazara areas of Uruzgan and other parts of Hazarajat to leave their hometowns and ancestral lands. causing many Hazaras fled to neighboring countries such as Central Asia, Iran, British India, Iraq and Syria. Those Hazaras living in the northern Hindu Kush went to Tsarist Russia, mostly in the southern cities of Russia, and some of them went to Iran. Hazara people living in the Tsarist Russian regions lost their language, accent and ethnic identity over time due to the similarities between the racial building and the physical appearance of the people of those regions, and they settled and gravitated among them. These fleeing Hazaras settled in previous Tsarist Russia regions, including Uzbekistan, Tajikistan, Turkmenistan, Kazakhstan and Dagestan. These Hazaras later became known as Khawari or Barbari. Another part of Hazaras from the southeast of the Hazara regions of Afghanistan has moved to British India, which resides in Quetta, present-day Pakistan. One of the most famous political and military figures of these Hazaras is Muhammad Musa Khan, who held the general's military rank in the Pakistani system. Another group has settled in Syria, Iraq and British India. These Hazara people who migrated to Pakistan, Iran, Syria and Iraq were unable to settle with the people of these areas because of the differences in physical appearance, so they have not lost their language, culture and ethnic identity.

20th and 21st century 

In 1901, Habibullah Khan, Abdur Rahman's eldest son and successor granted amnesty to all people who were exiled by his predecessor. Hazara continued to face social, economic and political discrimination through most of the 20th century. In 1933 Mohammed Nadir Shah the King of Afghanistan was assassinated by Abdul Khaliq Hazara, a school student. The Afghan government captured and executed him later, along with several of his family members.

Mistrust of the central government by the Hazaras and local uprisings continued. In particular, from 1945 to 1946, during Zahir Shah's rule, a revolt took place by the leadership of Ibrahim Khan most known as "Ibrahim Gawsawar" against new taxes that were exclusively imposed on Hazaras. The Kuchis meanwhile not only were exempted from taxes but also received allowances from the Afghan government. The angry rebels began capturing and killing government officials. In response, the central government sent a force to subdue the region and later removed the taxes.

The repressive policies of the People's Democratic Party of Afghanistan (PDPA) after the Saur Revolution in 1978 caused uprisings throughout the country. Fearing Iranian influence, the Hazaras were particularly persecuted. President Hafizullah Amin published in October 1979 a list of 12,000 victims of the Taraki government. Among them were 7,000 Hazaras who were shot in the notorious Pul-e-Charkhi prison.

During the Soviet-Afghan War, the Hazarajat region did not see as much heavy fighting as other regions of Afghanistan. Most of the Hazara mujahideen fought the Soviets in the regions which were on the periphery of the Hazarajat region. There was a division between the Tanzeem Nasle Nau Hazara, a party based in Quetta, of Hazara nationalists and secular intellectuals, and the Islamist parties in Hazarajat. By 1979, the Hazara-Islamist groups had already liberated Hazarajat from the central Soviet-backed Afghan government and later took entire control of Hazarajat away from the secularists. By 1984, the Islamist dominance of Hazarajat was complete.
As the Soviets withdrew in 1989, the Islamist groups felt the need to broaden their political appeal and turned their focus to Hazara nationalism. This led to the establishment of the Hizbe-Wahdat, an alliance of all the Hazara resistance groups (except the Harakat-e Islami). In 1992 with the fall of Kabul, the Harakat-e Islami took sides with Burhanuddin Rabbani's government while the Hizbe-Wahdat took sides with the opposition. The Hizbe-Wahdat was eventually forced out of Kabul in 1995 when the Taliban movement captured and killed their leader Abdul Ali Mazari. With the Taliban's capture of Kabul in 1996, all the Hazara groups united with the new Northern Alliance against the common new enemy. However, despite fierce resistance Hazarajat fell to the Taliban in 1998. The Taliban had Hazarajat isolated from the rest of the world going as far as not allowing the United Nations to deliver food to the provinces of Bamyan, Ghor, Maidan Wardak and Daykundi.

In 1997, a revolt broke out among Hazaras in Mazar-e Sharif when they refused to be disarmed by the Taliban; 600 Taliban were killed in subsequent fighting. In retaliation, the genocidal policies of Abdur Rahman Khan's era was adopted by the Taliban. In 1998, six thousand Hazaras were killed in the north; the intention was ethnic cleansing of Hazaras. In March 2001, the two giant Buddhas of Bamiyan, were also destroyed even though there was a lot of condemnation.

Hazaras have also played a significant role in the creation of Pakistan. One such Hazara was Qazi Muhammad Isa of the Sheikh Ali tribe, who had been close friends with Muhammad Ali Jinnah, having met each other for the first time while they were studying in London. He had been the first from his native province of Balochistan to obtain a Bar-at-Law degree and had helped set up the All-India Muslim League in Balochistan.

Though Hazaras played a role in the anti-Soviet movement, other Hazaras participated in the new communist government, which actively courted Afghan minorities. Sultan Ali Kishtmand, a Hazara, served as prime minister of Afghanistan from 1981 to 1990 (with one brief interruption in 1988). The Ismaili Hazara of Baghlan Province likewise supported the communists, and their pir (religious leader) Jaffar Naderi led a pro-Communist militia in the region.

During the years that followed, Hazara suffered severe oppression, and many ethnic massacres, genocides, and pogroms were carried out by the predominantly ethnic Pashtun Taliban and are documented by such groups as the Human Rights Watch.

Following the September 11, 2001 attacks in the United States, American and Coalition forces invaded Afghanistan. After the fall of the Taliban many Hazaras became important figures in Afghanistan. Hazara have also pursued higher education, enrolled in the army, and many have top government positions. For example, Some Vice Presidents, ministers and governors were Hazara, including Karim Khalili, Sarwar Danish, Sima Samar, Muhammad Mohaqiq, Habiba Sarābi, Abdul Haq Shafaq, Sayed Anwar Rahmati, Qurban Ali Urozgani, Muhammad Arif Shah Jahan, Mahmoud Baligh, Mohammad Eqbal Munib and Mohammad Asim Asim. The mayor of Nili, Daykundi was Azra Jafari, who became the first female mayor in Afghanistan. Some other notable Hazaras include Sultan Ali Keshtmand, Abdul Wahed Sarābi, Akram Yari, Ghulam Ali Wahdat, Sayed Mustafa Kazemi, Commander Shafi Hazara, Ghulam Husain Naseri, Ali Akbar Qasimi, Abbas Noyan, Abas Basir, Daoud Naji, Abbas Ibrahim Zada, Ramazan Bashardost, Ahmad Shah Ramazan, Ahmad Behzad, Nasrullah Sadiqi Zada Nili, Fahim Hashimi, Maryam Monsef, Asadullah Saadati, Muhammad Hussain Fahimi, and others.

Although Afghanistan has been historically one of the poorest countries in the world, the Hazarajat region has been kept less developed by past governments. Since the ousting of the Taliban in late 2001, billions of dollars poured into Afghanistan for reconstruction and several large-scale reconstruction projects took place in Afghanistan from August 2012. For example, there have been more than 5000 kilometers of road pavement completed across Afghanistan, of which little was done in central Afghanistan. On the other hand, the Band-e Amir in Bamyan province became the first national park in Afghanistan. A road from Kabul to Bamyan was also built, along with new police stations, government institutions, hospitals and schools in the provinces of Bamyan, Daykundi and other mostly Hazara-populated provinces. The first ski resort in Afghanistan was also established in Bamyan province.

Discrimination indicates that Kuchis (Pashtun nomads who have historically been migrating from region to region depending on the season) are allowed to use Hazarajat pastures during the summer season. It is believed that allowing the Kuchis to use some of the grazing lands in Hazarajat began during the rule of Abdur Rahman Khan. Living in mountainous Hazarajat, where little farmland exists, Hazara people rely on these pasture lands for their livelihood during the long and harsh winters. In 2007 some Kuchi nomads entered parts of Hazarajat to graze their livestock, and when the local Hazara resisted, a clash took place and several people on both sides died using assault rifles. Such events continue to occur, even after the central government was forced to intervene, including President Hamid Karzai. In late July 2012, a Hazara police commander in Uruzgan province reportedly rounded up and killed 9 Pashtun civilians in revenge for the death of two local Hazara. The matter is being investigated by the Afghan government.

The drive by President Hamid Karzai after the Peace Jirga to strike a deal with Taliban leaders caused deep unease in Afghanistan's minority communities, who fought the Taliban the longest and suffered the most during their rule. The leaders of the Tajik, Uzbek and Hazara communities, vowed to resist any return of the Taliban to power, referring to the large-scale massacres of Hazara civilians during the Taliban period.

Following the fall of Kabul to the Taliban in 2021, which ended the war in Afghanistan, concerns were raised as to whether the Taliban would reimpose the persecution of Hazaras as in the 1990s. An academic at Melbourne's La Trobe University said that "The Hazaras are very fearful that the Taliban will likely be reinstating the policies of the 1990s" despite Taliban reassurances that they will not revert to the bad old ways of the 1990s.

Demographics 

Some sources claim that Hazaras comprise about 20 to 30 percent of the total population of Afghanistan. They were by far the largest ethnic group in the past, in 1888–1893 Uprisings of Hazaras over sixty percent of them were massacred with some being displaced.

Geographic distribution

Afghanistan 

The historical and main homeland of the Hazara people is the Hazaristan or Hazarajat that lies in the central highlands of Afghanistan, among the Kuh-e Baba mountains and the western extremities of the Hindu Kush. Its boundaries have historically been inexact and shifting, and that is Afghanistan’s one of the Turko-Mongol regions. Until the 1890s, the Hazaras were largely autonomous and controlled the entire Hazaristan region. Nowadays, the vast majority of Hazaras reside in Hazaristan and are generally scattered throughout Afghanistan and its cities.

Pakistan 

During the period of British colonial rule on the Indian subcontinent in the 19th century, Hazaras worked during the winter months in coal mines, road construction, and other working-class jobs in some cities of what is now Pakistan. The earliest record of Hazara in the areas of Pakistan is found in Broadfoot's Sappers company from 1835 in Quetta. This company had also participated in the First Anglo-Afghan War. Some Hazara also worked on the agriculture farms in Sindh and the construction of the Sukkur barrage.
In 1962, the government of Pakistan recognized the Hazaras as one of the ethnic groups of Pakistan.

Most Pakistani Hazaras live in Quetta, Balochistan, Pakistan. Localities in the city of Quetta with prominent Hazara populations include Hazara Town and Mehr Abad and Hazara tribes such as the Sardar are exclusively Pakistani. The literacy level among the Hazara community in Pakistan is relatively high compared to the Hazaras of Afghanistan, and they have integrated well into the social dynamics of the local society. Saira Batool, a Hazara woman, was one of the first female pilots in the Pakistan Air Force. Other notable Hazaras include Qazi Muhammad Isa, General Muhammad Musa Khan, who served as the 4th Commander-in-Chief of the Pakistan Army from 1958 to 1968, Air Marshal Sharbat Ali Changezi, whose years of service in the Pakistan Air Force were from 1949 to 1987, Hussain Ali Yousafi, the slain chairman of the Hazara Democratic Party, Sayed Nasir Ali Shah, MNA from Quetta and his father Haji Sayed Hussain Hazara who was a senator and member of Pakistan Parliament during the Zia-ul-Haq era.

Despite all of this, Hazaras are often targeted by militant groups such as the Lashkar-e-Jhangvi and others. "Activists say at least 800-1,000 Hazaras have been killed since 1999 and the pace is quickening. More than one hundred have been murdered in and around Quetta since January, according to Human Rights Watch." The political representation of the community is served by Hazara Democratic Party, a secular liberal democratic party, headed by Abdul Khaliq Hazara.

Iran 

The Hazara people in Iran are also referred to as Khāwari or Barbari. Over many years as a result of political unrest in Afghanistan, some Hazaras have migrated to Iran. The local Hazara population has been estimated at 500,000 people including Afghan immigrants who make up the majority of it. At least one-third have spent more than half their life in Iran. Before the separation of Afghanistan from Iran according to the Treaty of Paris in 1857 during the reign of Naser al-Din Shah, Greater Khorasan covered a part of the west of this land and various tribes or ethnic groups lived in it. One of these tribes was the Hazaras. This tribe, who settled on both sides of the border after drawing the border line between Iran and Afghanistan, has played many roles in the contemporary history of Khorasan province and especially Mashhad. The leadership of this tribe at the end of the Qajar period and also the Pahlavi period was with Sulat al-Sultanah Hazara, a Sunni Hazara who was a politician and the first Sunni and Hazara representative member in the Iranian Parliament and the only Sunni Iranian who has represented Mashhad in the history of Iran's legislatures.

Diaspora 

Alessandro Monsutti argues, in his recent anthropological book, that migration is the traditional way of life of the Hazara people, referring to the seasonal and historical migrations which have never ceased and do not seem to be dictated only by emergencies such as war. Due to the decades of war in Afghanistan and the sectarian violence in Pakistan, many Hazaras left their communities and have settled in Australia, New Zealand, Canada, the United States, the United Kingdom and particularly the Northern European countries such as Sweden and Denmark. Some go to these countries as exchange students while others through human smuggling, which sometimes costs them their lives. Since 2001, about 1,000 people have died in the ocean while trying to reach Australia by boats from Indonesia. Many of these were Hazaras. The notable case was the Tampa affair in which a shipload of refugees, mostly Hazaras, was rescued by the Norwegian freighter MV Tampa and subsequently sent to Nauru.

Culture 

Hazara culture is a combination of customs, traditions, behaviors, beliefs and norms that have been formed in interaction and confrontation with the surrounding phenomena for many years and now it is displayed as a cultural identity.
The Hazara culture is rich in heritage, with many unique cultures, and has common influences with various cultures of Central Asia and South Asia. The Hazara, outside of Hazarajat, have adopted the cultures of the cities where they dwell, resembling the cultures and traditions of the Afghan Tajiks and Pashtuns. Traditionally the Hazara are highland farmers. In Hazarajat, they have retained many of their own cultures and traditions, some of which are more closely related to those of Central Asians than to those of the Afghan Tajiks. The Hazara live in houses, but some of the Aimaq Hazara who are semi-nomadic live in yurts covered with felt.

Attire 

Hazara clothing have an important and special role in supporting the cultural, traditional and social identity of the Hazara ethnicity. Hazara clothes are produced manually and by machine; In Afghanistan these types of clothes are sewn in most parts of the country, especially in central provinces of Afghanistan.

Male clothing 

Hazara men traditionally wear barak, also called barag, and hat. Barak is one of the important components of Hazara people's clothing. Barak is a kind of soft, sticky and thick piece made from the first wool of lambs of special sheep that are raised in Hazarajat, provided. In addition to being a very acceptable, stylish, and regal clothe, the Hazara barak is also a warm winter that is resistant to moisture and does not get wet easily in snow and rain. Also, barak has a special property and softness, it reduces muscle pains and is also healing for joint pains. Nowadays, the most common clothes among Hazara men is the perahan o tunban and sometimes with a hat or a turban.

Female clothing 
The traditional clothing of Hazara women includes a pleated skirt with a tunban or undergarment. The lower tunbans are made of fabrics such as flowered chits and the upper skirts are made of better fabrics such as velvet or zari and net and have a border or decoration at the bottom. The women's shirt is calf-length, close-collared, and long-sleeved, and has slits on both sides that are placed on the skirts, which are admired for their completeness in the Islamic set. Hazara women's clothing has certain characteristics according to their social, economic, and age conditions. The clothes of young Hazara women are made of different fabrics in different colors and happy designs with beautiful and colorful chador, but older women prefer dark-colored fabrics with simple black and white designs. Hazara women's chador or head cover is often decorated with ornaments that is often silver or gold, and sometimes with a hat. The ornaments on the clothe is silver or gold necklace with colorful beads, buttons, bangles and silver or gold bracelets.

Cuisine 

The Hazara cuisine is strongly influenced by Central Asian, South Asian and Persian cuisines. However, there are special foods, cooking methods and different cooking styles that are specific to them.
They have a hospitable dining etiquette. In their culture, it is customary to prepare special food for guests.

Art

Music 

Many Hazara musicians are widely hailed as being skilled in playing the dambura, a native, regional lute instrument similarly found in other Central Asian nations, such as Kazakhstan, Uzbekistan and Tajikistan. Some of the famous Hazara musician and dambura players are, such as Sarwar Sarkhosh, Dawood Sarkhosh, Safdar Tawakoli, Sayed Anwar Azad and others. 
In Hazara dambura revolutionary hymns are very common. The first singer who started singing revolutionary hymns on dambura was Sarwar Sarkhosh, and his main message was the uprising of the young generation and the fight against oppression.
Also Ghaychak a field instruments in music that is usually played like a fiddle. The resonance bowl is made of walnuts or berries and its wires are metal which is one of the stringed instruments in Hazara music.

Cinema 

Hazara cinema artists have no older background, but nowadays some of their famous actors and actresses include Hussain Sadiqi, Abid Ali Nazish, Shamila Shirzad, Nikbakht Noruz and others.

Writers and poets 

Some famous Hazara writers and poets include Faiz Muhammad Kateb, Amir Khosrow Dehlavi, Ismael Balkhi, Hassan Poladi, Kazim Yazdani, Ali Mohaqiq Nasab, Kamran Mir Hazar, Basir Ahang, Sayed Askar Mousavi, Ali Baba Taj, Sayed Abutalib Mozaffari, Muhammad Akram Gizabi and so on.

Cultural sports

Buzkashi 

Buzkashi is a Central Asian sport in which horse-mounted players attempt to place a goat or calf carcass in a goal. It is the national sport in Afghanistan and is one of the cultural sports of the Hazara people and they still practice this sport in Afghanistan.

Tirandāzi 

Tirandāzi is a kind of archery and an old cultural sport of Hazaras.

Pahlawani 

Pahlawani or Kushti is a kind of cultural wrestling sport that is performed by Hazaras. Pahlawani has a long history in Afghanistan and among the Hazaras. In Afghanistan, on holidays, Pahlawani fields are set up. Pahlawani is held in different age groups. This cultural sport has its special techniques. Because this sport is very ancient and familiar, it has been continued from generation to generation among the Hazara people.

Language 

Hazara people living in Hazaristan (Hazarajat) region speak the Hazaragi dialect. According to Encyclopaedia of Islam, Hazaragi is a Persian dialect, which is infused with many Turkic and a few Mongolic words or loanwords. According to Atif Adnan, the Hazara population speaks Persian with some Mongolian words. The primary differences between Persian and Hazaragi are the accent. Despite these differences, Hazaragi is mutually intelligible with Dari, one of the two official languages in Afghanistan. 

According to Doctor of Sciences Lutfi Temirkhanov, the ancestors of the Hazaras were Mongol-speaking and only after the resettlement, they mixed with the Persian-speaking and Turkic-speaking population: "hordes of Mongol princes and feudal lords found themselves in a Persian-speaking encirclement; they mixed with them, were influenced by the Persian-Tajik culture and gradually adopted the Persian language". According to a number of sources, in the 16th century the Mongolian language was widespread among the Hazaras. According to the Great Russian Encyclopedia, until the 19th century Hazaras spoke Mongolian. And according to Temirkhanov, the Mongolian elements make up 10% of the Hazara vocabulary.

Religion 

Hazaras predominantly practice Islam, mostly the Shi'a of the Twelver sect, with significant Sunni, some Isma'ili and Non-denominational Muslim minorities. The majority of Afghanistan's population practices Sunni Islam; this may have contributed to the discrimination against them.
There is no single theory about the acceptance of the Shi'a Islam by the majority of Hazaras. Probably most of them accepted Shi'a Islam during the first part of the 16th century, in the early days of the Safavid dynasty.

Sunni Hazaras 

A significant and almost a large population of Hazara people are Sunni Muslims.
Sunni Hazaras have been Sunni since long ago and before the occupation of Hazara lands by Abdul Rahman, but some of them were converted from Shia to Sunni Islam after the occupation of Hazara lands by Abdul Rahman and 1888–1893 Hazara uprisings.
In Afghanistan, they inhabit in different provinces such as Kabul, Baghlan, Badghis, Ghor, Kunduz, Panjshir, Bamyan, Badakhshan, Parwan and in some other regions of Afghanistan.
Some Sunni Hazaras, who have been attached to non-Hazara tribes are the Timuri and Aimaq Hazara.

A Sunni Hazara, Sher Muhammad Khan Hazara, the chieftain of the Hazaras of  Qala e Naw region and a warlord who participant in the Sunni coalition that defended Herat in 1837.
Also, one of the defeaters of British forces around Qandahar and Maiwand desert during the First Anglo-Afghan War in 1838–1842.

Isma'ili Hazaras 
Isma'ili Hazaras mainly live in provinces of Kabul, Parwan, Baghlan and Bamyan. And their smaller groups live in Maidan Wardak, Samangan, Zabul and...
The Isma'ili Hazaras have always been kept separate from the rest of the Hazaras on account of religious beliefs and political purposes.

Hazara tribes 

The Hazara people have been organized by various tribes. Some overarching Hazara tribes are Sheikh Ali, Jaghori, Jaghatu, Qara Baghi, Ghaznichi, Muhammad Khwaja, Behsudi, Daimirdadi, Turkmani, Uruzgani, Daikundi, Daizangi, Daichopan, Daizinyat, Qarlugh, Aimaq Hazara and others. The different tribes come from Hazaristan (Hazara regions), such as Parwan, Bamyan, Ghazni, Ghor, Urozgan, Daikundi, Maidan Wardak and... have spread outwards from Hazaristan (main region) in other parts of Afghanistan, and also in other Hazara-populated areas.

Sports 

Many Hazaras engaged in varieties of sports, including football, volleyball, wrestling, martial arts, boxing, karate, taekwondo, judo, wushu, Jujitsu, Cricket, Tennis and more. Pahlawan Ebrahim Khedri, a 62 kg wrestler, was the national champion for two decades in Afghanistan. Another famous Hazara wrestler, Wakil Hussain Allahdad, was killed in the 22 April 2018 Kabul suicide bombing in Dashte Barchi, Kabul.

Rohullah Nikpai, won a bronze medal in Taekwondo at the Beijing Olympics 2008, beating world champion Juan Antonio Ramos of Spain 4–1 in a play-off final. It was Afghanistan's first-ever Olympic medal. He then won a second Olympic medal for Afghanistan in the London 2012 games.

Another famous Hazara athlete Sayed Abdul Jalil Waiz was the first ever badminton player representing Afghanistan in Asian Junior Championships in 2005 where he produced the first win for his country against Iraq, with 15–13, 15–1. He participated in several international championships since 2005 and achieved victories against Australia, the Philippines and Mongolia. Hamid Rahimi, is a Hazara boxer from Afghanistan who lives in Germany. Hussain Sadiqi, is a Hazara Australian martial artist who won an award for the best fight scene for an Australian-made action movie.

Hazara football players are Zohib Islam Amiri who is currently playing for the Afghanistan national football team, Moshtaq Yaqoubi an Afghan-Finnish footballer who plays for HIFK, Mustafa Amini, a Hazara Australian footballer who plays as a midfielder for Danish Superliga club AGF and the Australian national team, Rahmat Akbari an Australian footballer who plays as a midfielder for Brisbane Roar, and others like Rohullah Iqbalzada, Omran Haydary, Zelfy Nazary, Moshtaq Ahmadi and Zahra Mahmoodi.

A Pakistani Hazara Abrar Hussain, a former Olympic boxer served as deputy director-general of the Pakistan Sports Board. He represented Pakistan three times at the Olympics and won a gold medal at the 1990 Asian Games in Beijing. Another Hazara boxer from Pakistan is Haider Ali a Commonwealth Games gold medalist and Olympian who is currently retired. Some Hazara from Pakistan have also excelled in sports and have received numerous awards, particularly in boxing, football and field hockey.
New Hazara youngsters are seen to appear in many sports in Pakistan mostly from Quetta. Rajab Ali Hazara, who is leading the under 16 Pakistan Football team as captain.

Another is Kulsoom Hazara, a Pakistani female karate champion who has won several gold, silver and bronze medals on national and international stages, including Pride of Pakistan Award. Other karateka Hazaras include Nargis Hameedullah who became the first Pakistani woman to win an individual medal (a bronze) at the Asian Games karate championship, and Shahida Abbasi.

Notable people

Gallery

See also 

 Hazara nationalism
 Ethnic groups in Afghanistan
 Ethnic groups in Pakistan
 Demographics of Central Asia
 Aimaq Hazara

References

Further reading

External links 

 
 Hazara tribal structure, Program for Culture and Conflict Studies, US Naval Postgraduate School
 Peril and Persecution in Afghanistan

Hazara people
Ethnic groups in Afghanistan
Ethnic groups in Pakistan
Ethnic groups in Iran